Günəşli or Güneşli or Güneşlı may refer to:

Günəşli, Bilasuvar, Azerbaijan
Günəşli, Davachi, Azerbaijan
Günəşli, Gadabay, Azerbaijan
Güneşli, Gönen, Turkey
Güneşli, İnebolu, Turkey
Günəşli, Jalilabad, Azerbaijan
Günəşli, Kalbajar, Azerbaijan
Günəşli, Khachmaz, Azerbaijan
Günəşli, Khojavend, Azerbaijan
Günəşli, Lerik, Azerbaijan
Günəşli, Saatly, Azerbaijan
Günəşli, Shamkir, Azerbaijan
Güneşlı, Siazan, Azerbaijan
Yeni Günəşli, Azerbaijan

See also
 Güneyli (disambiguation)